The InterContinental Kuwait Downtown was a planned InterContinental hotel in Kuwait City, Kuwait. Announced in 2012, it was scheduled for completion in early 2015. It was to be located in close proximity to the government and business centre of the city.

See also
 List of tallest buildings in Kuwait

References

Buildings and structures in Kuwait City
Hotels in Kuwait
InterContinental hotels